The Modern Age is the debut EP by American rock band The Strokes. It was released on January 29, 2001 in the United Kingdom, by independent label Rough Trade Records, and May 22, 2001 in the United States, sparking a bidding war among record labels, the largest for a rock band in years.

All the songs were re-recorded for their debut album, Is This It, with slightly different lyrics and song structures.

Track listing 
All songs written by Julian Casablancas.

 "The Modern Age" – 3:13
 "Last Nite" – 3:19
 "Barely Legal" – 4:37

Charts

Weekly charts

Year-end charts

References

External links 
 

2001 debut EPs
The Strokes EPs
Beggars Banquet Records EPs
Rough Trade Records EPs